General San Martín Department may refer to:
General San Martín Department, Córdoba in Argentina
General San Martín Department, La Rioja in Argentina
General San Martín Department, Salta in Argentina

Department name disambiguation pages